The 1994–95 season was the 54th season in Albacete Balompié's history.

Squad
Retrieved on 21 January 2021

Transfers

In

Out

Squad stats 
Last updated on 29 December 2020.

|-
|colspan="14"|Players who have left the club after the start of the season:

|}

Competitions

Overall

1. Despite losing in the La Liga relegation play-offs, Albacete were not relegated due to the administration scandal involving Sevilla and Celta Vigo.

La Liga

League table

Matches

Relegation play-offs

1. Despite losing in the La Liga relegation play-offs, Albacete were not relegated due to the administration scandal involving Sevilla and Celta Vigo.

Copa del Rey

References

Albacete Balompié seasons
Albacete Balompié